The Northwest Catholic District School Board (TNCDSB, known as English-language Separate District School Board No. 33A prior to 1999) is a separate school board in Ontario serving the Rainy River District and portions of the Kenora District.

Schools and Offices
TNCDSB operate corporate offices in Fort Frances and business offices in Dryden.

The five elementary schools operated by TNCDSB are: Our Lady of the Way School in Morley; Sacred Heart School in Sioux Lookout; St. Joseph's School in Dryden; St. Patrick's School in Atikokan; and St. Mary School in Fort Frances.

TNCDSB does not operate any secondary schools.

Expansion
TNCDSB amalgamated the Atikokan Roman Catholic Separate School Board as of September 1, 2009.

See also
List of school districts in Ontario
List of high schools in Ontario

References

External links
 Northwest District Catholic School Board
St. Joseph's School
Our Lady of the Way School
Sacred Heart School
St. Mary School
St. Patrick School

Education in Rainy River District
Roman Catholic school districts in Ontario